A demographic profile is a form of demographic analysis in which information is gathered about a group to better understand the group's composition or behaviors for the purpose of providing more relevant services.

In business, a demographic profile is usually used to increase marketing efficiency. This is done by using gathered data to determine how to advertise products or services to specific audiences and identify gaps in marketing strategy. By focusing on a specific audience, a company can more efficiently spend advertising resources to maximize sales. This tactic is more direct than simply advertising on the basis that everyone is a potential consumer; while this may be true, it does not capitalize on the increased returns that more focused marketing can generate. 

Traditional demographic profiling involves gathering information on large groups of people in order to identify common trends, such as changes in population size or composition over time. These trends can be identified by analyzing data gained through surveys, censuses, in-store purchase information, records, registries, and so on. Analysis of this information may promote change in services for a population subset, such as children, the elderly, or working-age people. Newer methods of collecting and using information for demographic profiling include target-sampling, quota-sampling, and door-to-door screening.

A comprehensive demographic profile is a powerful tool for marketing. Detailed information about potential customers provides insight into how to best sell them a product. The term "demographic profiling" is sometimes used as a euphemism for industrial espionage.

Methods 
Historically, a census has been the most important tool when it comes to tracking demographic data such as population, births, deaths, and relationship status. The United States census was first introduced in 1790 and has been taken every 10 years since under constitutional law. While the questions in the US Census vary each decade, its aim is to quantifiable measure characteristics about the residents within its borders, such as marital status, age, sex, race, education status, employment status, and location. Even though the US Census is the most relied-on tool for collecting this information, it still has its flaws, such as overcount and undercount, which have caused controversy in previous years.

Metadata provides a modern method of constructing demographic profiles. Certain types of digital metadata are generated by a user's online behavior—such as which websites are frequently visited, the amount of time spent on each website, the website interactions or purchase history, and which other users were interacted with—and serve as a digital footprint. Metadata collection is so pervasive that businesses record most aspects of a user's online activity. Companies such as Google and Facebook make enormous profits through generating and processing metadata, which can then be used for targeted advertising. This process impacts the user's online experience, such as curating which ads are displayed or which websites are suggested.

Controversy 
Metadata collection has proven to be a controversial topic, with concerns expressed over how and why detailed personal information is saved and used by businesses. To avoid future legislation limiting metadata collection, companies must act ethically and have people's privacy in mind when they target people for advertising.

An example of how this could become an issue is presented by Ewing et al. (2013), who proposed the idea of a virtual reality shopping programme. Within this programme, the shopper is greeted by a virtual attendant who knows them by name and suggests an array of suitable clothing options based on their past purchases. The shopper is delighted by the seamless nature of this shopping experience. However, when they try to pay with their credit card, the virtual attendee reveals an unreasonably detailed knowledge about the shopper's financial situation, such as their credit score, payment history, and financial responsibility. This example highlights the need for discretion in the extent to which information is gathered, and how it is applied.

World demographic profile (2017) 

Source: CIA World Factbook

Demographic profiles of top 3 most populated countries

United States 

Source: CIA World Factbook

China 

Source: CIA World Factbook

India 

Source: CIA World Factbook

See also
 Demography
 Elderly
 Geodemography
 Market segmentation
 Mass marketing
 Niche market
 Population profiling
 Precision marketing
 Psychographic
 Psychological development
 Target market
 Population pyramid
 Demographics of India
 Demographics of China

References

Demographics
Market segmentation
Marketing
Marketing strategy
Market research